Stephen Chambers (born 1960) is a British artist and Royal Academician (elected 2005).

Education and career 
Chambers studied at Winchester School of Art from 1978 to 1979 and at Saint Martin's School of Art, from 1979 to 1982. in 1983, he received a master's degree from Chelsea School of Art. He has won many scholarships and awards, including a Rome Scholarship, a Fellowship at Winchester School of Art, and a Mark Rothko Memorial Trust Travelling Award.

From 1998 to 1989, Chambers was the Kettle’s Yard/Downing College Cambridge Fellow. In 2016, he was awarded an Honorary Fellowship from Downing College in the University of Cambridge.

He has exhibited widely, with more than 40 solo presentations, including The Big Country at the Royal Academy of Arts, London, in 2012, and at the Pera Museum, Istanbul, in 2014.

His work is held in many international collections including Arts Council England; Deutsche Bank, London; Downing College, Cambridge;Government Art Collection, London; Metropolitan Museum, New York; Pera Museum, Istanbul, and the Victoria and Albert Museum, London.

He has collaborated with Ashley Page and Orlando Gough on three contemporary dance productions for The Royal Ballet, London: Sleeping with Audrey (1996),Room of Cooks (1997,1999), and This House Will Burn (2001).

According to the artist, his work “speaks of states of mind, behaviours and sensibilities.” Critics have praised Chamber’s use of colour and his painterly exploration of his medium.

In May 2017, Chambers staged an exhibition entitled The Court of Redonda as an official collateral event at the Biennale Arte 2017 (Venice Biennale). The exhibition took its name from the literary legend of the Kingdom of Redonda, to which Chambers was introduced by the writings of the Spanish novelist Javier Marías.
Following the Venice exhibition, Chambers was awarded the title of Viscount Biennale of Redonda, and his Redondan works featured in 2018 at The Heong Gallery at Downing College, Cambridge.

References

External links 
 Stephenchambers.com
 

1960 births
Living people
British male artists
Royal Academicians